Site 200 at the Baikonur Cosmodrome is a launch site used by Proton rockets. It consists of two launch pads, areas 39 and 40. Area 39 is currently (as of 2021) used for Proton-M launches, including commercial flights conducted by International Launch Services. Area 40 is currently (as of 2021) inactive, as it was slated to be rebuilt as a launch site for the Angara rocket. Although the project was relocated to Site 250, Area 40 was not put back into service.

A number of planetary probes have been launched from Site 200. Venera 14, Venera 15, Vega 1, Fobos 1, the failed Mars-96, and ExoMars were launched from area 39. Venera 13, Venera 16, Vega 2, Fobos 2 were launched from Area 40. Area 39 was also the launch site for the core of the Mir space station, along with both Kvant modules, and the Kristall module. Salyut 7 and Granat were launched from Area 40.

On 13 May 2021 the pad was modified to support the launch of Nauka.

References

 
 

Baikonur Cosmodrome